Dida cidaria is the only species in the  monotypic moth genus Dida of the family Erebidae. It is known to be found in Mexico. Both the genus and the species were first described by Herbert Druce in 1891.

References

Hypeninae